The Chaouia is an Arabic-speaking tribal confederation made up of Arab and Berber tribes, and a historical region of Morocco. It is bounded by the Oum er-Rbi' River to its southwest, the Cherrate River to its northeast, the plain of Tadla to the southeast and the Atlantic Ocean to the northwest. The region covers a land area of nearly 14 000 km2.

Etymology 
The word "Chaouia" means "Land of Chaouis". "Chaoui" is an Arabic word meaning "sheeps possessors or shepherds".

Geography 
Geographically, the Chaouia can be divided into two sub-regions: low and high. The low Chaouia being the coastal part while the high Chaouia is further inland. Soils vary in fertility: The dark tirs is prized for its high yields and is found among the Mdhakra, Ouled Hriz and Oulad said. There is also the red hamri terra rossa.

Throughout Morocco's history, the Chaouia was famous for farming wheat and barley, which were exported in years of abundance from Casablanca, Fédala or Azemmour. Chaouia sheep was also prized for its wool, which was also exported to Marseille where it was known as wardigha in reference to one of the tribes in the interior.

Nowadays, the Chaouia is part of the Casablanca-Settat administrative region.

History 
Originally, the Chaouia was ruled by the Barghawata until it was unified to Morocco by the Almoravids, depopulating the area. After the Almohad ruler Abd al-Mu'min captured the town of Marrakesh in 1147, he encouraged the settlement of Bedouin Arab tribes in the area and the rest of the Moroccan coastal plains which were largely depopulated after the Almoravid conquest, including Banu Hilal, Banu Sulaym, and Banu Ma'qil, which led to a further extension of Arabic and an increased importance of Arab elements in the power equation of Morocco, to the point where no one could have ruled there without their co-operation.

In the early 20th century, the Chaouia carried out a strong rebellion against the French. In 1907, the French bombarded Casablanca and entered the Chaouia region before extending their control over all of Morocco. During the French protectorate, the Chaouia was part of the "Autonomous subdivision of Casablanca". It was then divided into three civilians controls : Chaouia-North (Casablanca), Chaouia-Center (Berrechid) and Chaouia-South (Settat).

Tribal composition 
The Chaouia tribal confederation traditionally consists of 14 Arabic-speaking tribes:

References

Bibliography
 F. Weisberger, Casablanca et les Chaouia en 1900, Ed. Impr. Réunies (Casablanca), 1935
 E. Marchand, Casablanca, la Chaouia, Ed. Larose (Paris), 1918

Regions of Morocco
Geography of Morocco
Arab tribes in Morocco